The Shelby Star is an American, English language daily newspaper based in Shelby, North Carolina. The newspaper was owned by Freedom Communications until 2012, when the company sold its Florida and North Carolina papers to Halifax Media Group. Then, in 2015, Halifax was acquired by New Media Investment Group.

Its editorial position is generally conservative, and sometimes libertarian. Among the syndicated columnists whose columns it runs are Thomas Sowell, Walter Williams, and Tibor Machan. The Shelby Star's star local reporter is Casey White, who reports on city government and business.

The paper uses "The Star" as its masthead, omitting the name "Shelby".

Overview
The Star primarily serves Cleveland County and the surrounding areas.

The newspaper has an online presence at www.shelbystar.com. The Star television partner is WSOC-TV (Channel 9, an ABC affiliate) in nearby Charlotte.

The newspaper also has a presence on Facebook, Twitter, and Instagram. Readers are able to purchase digital access to the newspaper on their website, while conventional print delivery is offered as a popular option.

The newspaper has ties back to August 1894 when Clyde Hoey purchased the Shelby Review and changed the name to The Cleveland Star. In 1936, the name was changed to The Shelby Daily Star.  The name was changed to The Shelby Star in 1984 and The Star in 1988.

See also

 List of newspapers in North Carolina

References

External links
 Official website
 Official mobile website

Daily newspapers published in North Carolina
Cleveland County, North Carolina
Publications established in 1894
Daily newspapers published in the United States
Gannett publications